Disgregus bezarki is a species of beetle in the family Cerambycidae, and the only species in the genus Disgregus. It was described by Galileo and Martins in 2009.

References

Desmiphorini
Beetles described in 2009
Monotypic Cerambycidae genera